Amadis de Grèce (Amadis of Greece) is an opera by the French composer André Cardinal Destouches, first performed at the Académie Royale de Musique (the Paris Opera) on 26 March 1699. It takes the form of a tragédie en musique in a prologue and five acts. The libretto, by Antoine Houdar de La Motte, is based on the medieval romance Amadis de Gaula. La Motte's text was adapted to produce the Italian-language libretto for Handel's opera seria Amadigi di Gaula (1715).

Characters

Main characters

Others 

 A young sailor
 An Enchanter
 An enchanted Knight
 An enchanted Princess
 The party leader
 Two Shepherds

Rehearsals 

Rehearsals were held at Fontainebleau on October 17 and 24, as well as on November 7, 1698. Here is what the Marquis de Dangeau recorded in his Journal :

Friday 17th, at Fontainebleau

Friday, 24th, at Fontainebleau

Friday, 7, at Fontainebleau

Early performances

Académie Royale de Musique in 1699 
Amadis de Grèce was premiered in the Académie Royale de Musique on the 26 of March, 1699.

Théâtre de la Monnaie in Brussels in 1711 
Amadis de Grèce was performed in the Théâtre de la Monnaie in Brussels in 1711.

Queen's Concerts in 1732 
Amadis de Grèce was performed during the Queen's Concerts in March 1732. The prologue and act I were performed on March 3 of 1732, then acts II and II on March 5, acts IV and V on March 10.

References

Sources 

  Libretto at "Livres baroques"
  Félix Clément and Pierre Larousse Dictionnaire des Opéras, Paris, 1881
 (in French) Opéra Baroque, Amadis de Grèce
Viking Opera Guide, ed. Amanda Holden (Viking, 1993): article on Amadis, p.262

Notes 

French-language operas
Tragédies en musique
1699 operas
Operas by André Cardinal Destouches
Operas
Opera world premieres at the Paris Opera